Łopuchowo  is a village in the administrative district of Gmina Tykocin, within Białystok County, Podlaskie Voivodeship, in north-eastern Poland.

The site at which Tykocin's Jews were murdered and buried by the Germans on August 25, 1941 during the occupation of Poland sits in the village's outskirts. Today, a memorial stands at the location.

References

Villages in Białystok County